Taxi to Heaven, is a 1943 Soviet comedy film directed by Gerbert Rappaport.

Plot 
A lonely pilot Baranov falls in love with a high-profile singer Natasha Kulikova, whose parents are categorically against the engagement, but young people are convinced that they will be happy together. But the war divides them.

Starring 
 Mikhail Zharov as Baranov
 Lyudmila Tselikovskaya as Natasha
 Boris Blinov as The Colonel
 Grigoriy Shpigel as Svellovidov
 Vladimir Gribkov as Kulikov (as V. Gribkov)
 Mikhail Kuznetsov as Co-pilot
 Tatyana Govorkova as Matilda Kulikova
 Konstantin Sorokin as Zadunajsky (as K. Sorokin)
 Vladimir Shishkin as Tolya
 Lyudmila Shabalina as Marusya (as L. Shabalina)

References

External links 
 

1943 films
1940s Russian-language films
Soviet comedy films
1943 comedy films
Soviet black-and-white films
Russian black-and-white films